The Final Project is a 2015 American found footage horror film directed by Taylor Ri'chard.  It stars Teal Haddock, Arin Jones, Leonardo Santaiti, Evan McLean, Sergio Suave, and Amber Erwin as student ghosthunters who fall prey to a vengeful spirit at a haunted Louisiana plantation.  It premiered in April 2015 and received a theatrical release in February 2016.

Plot 
After being told that they require extra credit to pass their film class, six college students investigate an abandoned plantation in rural Louisiana despite warnings from the locals that it is haunted.  While making a documentary, they find the rumors of a hostile spirit are true.

Cast 
 Teal Haddock as Anna Davenport
 Arin Jones as Genevieve Richard
 Leonardo Santaiti as Jonah Girard
 Evan McLean as Ky Brooks
 Sergio Suave as Gavin Charles
 Amber Erwin as Misty Gilroy
 Robert McCarley as Professor McCarley
 Tiffany Ford as store clerk
 Benjie Anderson as caretaker
 Charles Orr as Charles

Production 
After becoming dissatisfied with his corporate job, Ri'chard left it to pursue filmmaking.  The story, co-written by Ri'chard, was based on local stories about Chretien Point Plantation in Sunset, Louisiana.  When casting the film, Ri'chard looked for inexperienced actors, as he wanted the film to seem realistic and true to the "found footage" genre. Shooting began in 2012, but not all of the sets were available until 2014. Principal photography lasted six weeks and took place in Atlanta, Georgia. Ri'chard said he wanted to build relationships in his new home, Atlanta, rather than shoot on location.

Release 
The film screened in a one-night engagement in Louisiana, Texas and Georgia on April 16, 2015. CAVU Pictures released it theatrically on February 12, 2016, in Atlanta and Houston. It will play nationally on March 4, 2016, starting in New York and Los Angeles.

Reception 
Dennis Harvey of Variety called The Final Project an amateurish knockoff of The Blair Witch Project. Matt Boiselle of Dread Central rated it 1.5/5 stars and wrote that the film is "as color-by-numbers as the day is long". Matt Donato of We Got This Covered rated it 1.5/5 stars and wrote, "The Final Project proves that anyone can make a found footage movie, but not everyone should." However, Matiland McDonaugh of Film Journal International called it a "formulaic but atmospheric found-footage shocker" and  wrote that the film "features strong performances across the board". Troy Anderson of Anderson Vision rated it 3.5/5 stars and wrote, "...there is a place at the table for The Final Project." Though he criticized the film's editing, Mark L. Miller of Ain't It Cool News wrote, "The environment the film is made in is really spooky."  Following Films on their website wrote of The Final Project, "With enough jumps and shocks to satisfy the Fangoria crowd this film will find its audience."

References

External links 
 

2015 films
2015 horror films
2010s supernatural horror films
African-American horror films
American supernatural horror films
Found footage films
2010s ghost films
Films set in Louisiana
Films shot in Atlanta
American haunted house films
2010s English-language films
2010s American films